The Over-the-Hill Gang was the George Allen-coached Washington Redskins team of the early 1970s, so named due to the large number of veteran players on the team. Many of those players also played for Allen when he coached the Los Angeles Rams from 1966 to 1970.

The start of the Over-the-Hill Gang was the 1971 NFL Draft.  Of the Redskins first five picks that year, they only used one, deciding to trade the rest.  Allen had decided to build his team with experienced players who "did not have to mold to the NFL game".  One of these trades was for Billy Kilmer, a quarterback who had been playing for the New Orleans Saints.  As a starter for the Redskins, Kilmer threw for 3,869 yards and 32 touchdown passes. More importantly, he led the Redskins to back-to-back playoff appearances and became the first Redskins quarterback to start a Super Bowl.

This, however, was not the most important event in the '71 Draft that led to the creation of the gang.  Allen later dealt seven draft choices (including the first- and third-round picks in 1971) as well as linebacker Marlin McKeever to his former team, the Rams. In exchange, the Redskins received linebackers Jack Pardee, Myron Pottios and Maxie Baughan, defensive tackle Diron Talbert, guard John Wilbur and special teams player Jeff Jordan.  These players soon became a large part of the Over-the-Hill Gang defense.  The Redskins also picked up Boyd Dowler, an eleven-year veteran with the Green Bay Packers, who won five championships as a Packer.  He would later pick up strong safety Richie Petitbon (again from the Rams) and defensive tackle Ron McDole from the Buffalo Bills.

The average age of starters was 31 years old. Allen's strategy turned the Redskins around as the team improved to a 9-4-1 record in 1971, and finished the 1972 season with an NFC-best 11-3 record.  The retooled Redskins' nine victories in 1971 was the most by a Washington team in 29 years. In his seven seasons with the club, Allen and his veterans produced seven winning records, five playoff appearances, and one trip to the Super Bowl.

See also
 List of NFL nicknames

References

Over-the-Hill Gang
Washington Commanders